Colonel Raymond A. "Cheval" Lallemant,  (23 August 1919 – 30 January 2008) was a Belgian military pilot and flying ace who served in the British Royal Air Force (RAF) during the Second World War. He was credited with destroying six aircraft, making him one of the highest scoring Belgian aces of the conflict. Lallemant, who was nicknamed "Cheval" ("horse" in French), flew Hawker Typhoons in No. 609 Squadron in a ground attack role. Promoted to squadron leader and commanding officer of No. 609 Squadron in late 1944, Lallemand was shot down over the Netherlands in September 1944 but survived despite his injuries. He was awarded the Distinguished Flying Cross (DFC) and Bar.

In March 1945, "Cheval" Lallemant became the commanding officer of No. 349 (Belgian) Squadron, where he flew the Supermarine Spitfire Mk.XVI. The well known Spitfire "Winston Churchill", squadron indicator GE-D, was his personal aircraft until he left No. 349 (Belgian) Squadron in December 1945.

See also
Remy Van Lierde

Bibliography
 Lallemant, R.A. Rendez-vous avec la chance (in French). Paris: Robert Laffont, 1962.

External links

Le colonel Lallemant était un "as" de la RAF at La Libre Belgique
En mémoire de Raymond Lallemant at Le Courrier de l'Escaut

1919 births
2008 deaths
Belgian Royal Air Force personnel of World War II
Royal Air Force officers
People from Leuze-en-Hainaut
Belgian World War II flying aces
Shot-down aviators
Recipients of the Distinguished Flying Cross (United Kingdom)
Belgian Air Component officers
Belgian World War II pilots